Hymnsongs is the title of a 2003 instrumental album by guitarist Phil Keaggy.

Track listing
 "Prelude"
 "In the Bleak Midwinter"
 "O Sacred Head, Now Wounded"
 "Abide with Me"
 "This Fragile Vessel"
 "Jerusalem"
 "Simple Gifts"
 "Chorale #198"
 "Fairest Lord Jesus"
 "Nothing But the Blood"
 "Be Still My Soul"
 "O for a Closer Walk With Thee"
 "Our Daily Bread"
 "The Day Thou Gavest, Lord, Has Ended"

Personnel 

 Phil Keaggy – guitars, bass, mandolin, loops
 Ric Hordinski – guitar, sampling, effects
 Josh Seurkamp – drums

Production notes
 Ric Hordinski – arranger, engineer, mixing, treatments
 Phil Keaggy – engineer, mixing
 Richard Dodd – mastering
 Barry Landis – executive producer
 Katherine Petillo – creative director
 Jay Smith – art direction, design, illustrations
 Mark Bacus – liner notes
 Paul Gerhardt – translation
 James Alexander – translation
 Keith Getty – adaptation

References 

2002 albums
Instrumental albums
Phil Keaggy albums